Uckfield is a town in the Wealden District of East Sussex in South East England. The town is on the River Uck, one of the tributaries of the River Ouse, on the southern edge of the Weald.

Etymology
'Uckfield', first recorded in writing as 'Uckefeld' in 1220, is an Anglo-Saxon place name meaning 'open land of a man called Ucca'. It combines an Old English personal name, 'Ucca' with the Old English locational term, 'feld', the latter denoting open country or unencumbered ground (or, from 10th century onwards, arable land). A number of other places in the area also contain the suffix 'feld', which may be an indication of land that contrasts with the surrounding woodlands of the Weald, including in particular Ashdown Forest immediately to the north.

History
 A comprehensive historical timeline can be found at A vision of Britain website.
The first mention in historical documents is in the late thirteenth century. Uckfield developed as a stopping-off point on the pilgrimage route between Canterbury, Chichester and Lewes. The settlement began to develop around the bridging point of the river, including the locally famous Pudding Cake Lane where travellers visited a public house for slices of pudding cake; and the 15th-century Bridge Cottage, the oldest house still standing in Uckfield, now a museum. The town developed in the High Street and in the New Town areas (the latter to the south of the original town centre).

The Eversfield family, who later became prominent in Sussex history, giving their name to the prime waterfront street of St Leonards-on-Sea, first settled in Uckfield from their Surrey beginnings. The family, who later owned the mansion Denne Park in Horsham, which they represented in Parliament, acquired a large fortune through marriage, real estate acquisition and iron foundering. Their climb to wealth and prominence was a heady one: in fifteenth-century Sussex they were described as 'yeomen', but within a generation they were already among the first rank of Sussex gentry.

Church Street

Church Street was at the heart of the original settlement of Uckfield, near the medieval chapel (built c.1291), which was replaced by the present parish church in 1839. It is situated on an ancient ridgeway route from the direction of Winchester in the west, to Rye and Canterbury in the east. Local hostelries along the route are the Maiden's Head, the King's Head (now the Cinque Ports) or the Spread Eagle. Uckfield was part of the Archbishop's extensive Manor of South Malling.

Church Street contains a number of post-medieval buildings. These include the Old Grammar School (home of the former Uckfield Grammar School, closed in 1930), Bakers Cottage and the Malt House with Malt Cottage (all built before 1700), and Church House with Andertons, Copping Hall and Milton Cottage (all 18th century). Inhabitants of these properties were the Markwicks (builders and carpenters, from 1700) at Coppinghall and Milton Cottage, Edward Kenward (19th century maltster) at the Malt House, Thomas Pentecost (a Victorian leather cutter and local poet) in a cottage near the Grammar School and General Sir George Calvert Clarke (commander of the Royal Scots Greys at Balaclava) at Church House.

Bridge Cottage

Studies suggest that the cottage dates to around 1436. Between 1500 and 1900 it was inhabited by a number of local families including local merchants. In October 2014 the Heritage Lottery Fund granted one million pounds to enable the restoration of the cottage. Work started in October 2014, with an estimated completion date of late summer 2015.

Governance

The town council consists of 15 councillors, representing five wards: West ward (2 councillors); New Town (4); North (3); East (3); and Ridgewood (3).  Mayoral elections take place every year.

Uckfield was previously represented at Westminster by Charles Hendry, Member of Parliament for the constituency of Wealden from 2001 until he stood down at the 2015 general election.

On 7 May 2015 Nus Ghani was elected as the MP for Wealden with a majority of 22,967. In the 2017 snap general election, Ghani was re-elected with a slightly increased majority of 23,268.

Geography
The town of Uckfield has grown up as a road hub, and on the crossing point of the River Uck. Traffic on the A26 between Royal Tunbridge Wells and Lewes, from the north-east to the south-west, joins with that on the A22 London – Eastbourne road around the town on its bypass; whilst the long-distance cross-country A272 road (the old pilgrimage route) crosses them both north of the town.

As the town has grown, new housing estates were developed: Hempstead Fields, Harlands Farm, Rocks Park, West Park, Manor Park and Ringles Cross among them.

Parts of Uckfield, owing to its location on the river, have been subject to extensive flooding on a number of occasions, the earliest recorded being in 1852. More recent floods have occurred approximately every nine years: in 1962, 1974, 1989, 1994, 2000 and 2007, although those in 2007 were not as severe as previous floods. Local residents have long been lobbying for flood defences in the town, and when the local Somerfield became a Co-op (now Waitrose), its car park's walls were rebuilt as flood defences with a ramp to access the car park and a watertight pedestrian gate that can be closed when flooding is imminent. It is hoped that this new wall will act as a reservoir to contain the flood water until it recedes, allowing the water to flow back into the river Uck, which runs alongside the carpark. Due to the positioning of the river within Uckfield, any flooding is within the lowest part of the town centre and industrial estate, and so does not affect residential areas as these are all built on higher ground. The Hempstead Meadows Nature Reserve can be accessed from the car park (now owned by Waitrose, who took over from the Co-op) and shows classic meadows formed on the flood plain.

The West Park Nature Reserve contains a wide variety of habitats; it is located on the western edge of the town.

Nature Reserves

West Park

West Park is a Local Nature Reserve. It has several access points, and is a vestige of ancient parkland, containing herb rich uncultivated wet meadow, woodland, some thriving wildlife and the remains of Mesolithic settlement.

Hempstead Meadows

Hempstead Meadows is a Local Nature Reserve. The River Uck runs through the flood plain, occupied by the Hempstead Nature Reserve, and is an important area of wetland. The area has an abundance of unusual flora and fauna, which flourish on this ideal site. A new footpath, the River walk is a recent introduction to this area.

Harlands Pond
Harlands Pond, located via Mallard Drive, home of the common toad. Regular visitors include the heron, in addition to its permanent residents, the coot and moorhen.

Nightingale Wood
Almost adjacent to the pond is Nightingale Wood. This is a cool, shady haven, containing many different tree species and is a valuable site for early purple orchids.

Millennium Green
To the south of the town in Ridgewood the Uckfield Millennium Green is present on a site of disused clay pits (now a SNCI)

Development
East Sussex County Council completed phase one of the Uckfield Town Centre Highway Improvement Scheme (UTC-HIS) in November 2014. In January 2016 phase two of the highway improvements were started, taking approximately eight months. The scheme involved the creation of 10,000 m2 of retail space within the town. It also limits to 1000 the number of new homes to be built between then and 2027.

In June 2015 the Ridgewood Farm development was granted outline planning approval. The development would see 1000 new homes of which a minimum of 15% would be affordable housing. The development would include a two-form primary school, a large employment space, community, health and leisure facilities and pedestrian and cycle paths, and a 73-acre Suitable Alternative Natural Green Space (Sangs) nearby.

In July 2015 Network Rail announced plans to upgrade the platforms at Uckfield railway station to accommodate trains with up to 12 carriages. The works were predicted to last from November 2015 until March 2016.

In March 2016 developers were granted a 75% reduction on the roof tax of 146 proposed homes at Mallard Drive, Ridgewood.

Demography
The population of Uckfield in 1811 was 916; in 1841 was 1,534; in 1861 was 1,740; in 1871 was 2,041; in 1881 was 2,146; in 1891 was 2,497; in 1901 was 2,895; in 1911 was 3,344; in 1921 was 3,385; and in 1931 was 3,555. In 2001 it was 13,697.

Transport

Uckfield is connected to London Bridge station by Southern services on its Oxted Line via East Croydon. Until 1969 the rail link continued to Lewes; after it was closed Uckfield became the terminus; the station building was rebuilt in 1991 to allow the removal of a level crossing.  The Wealden Line Campaign hopes to reopen the closed section to Lewes.

There are 20 local bus services in the Uckfield area; Brighton and Hove, CTLA, Renown Coaches, The Sussex Bus, Seaford & District and Stagecoach in Eastbourne all serve Uckfield. National Express coaches also operate to London.

Education
Uckfield College is the secondary school in the town. There are five primary schools; Harlands Primary School, Holy Cross CE Primary School, Rocks Park Primary School St Philips Catholic Primary School and Manor Primary School.

Churches and chapels

The Church of England parish church is dedicated to the Holy Cross. Queen Elizabeth II made several unannounced low-profile visits to St Michael and All Angels Church, Little Horsted, which became widely known locally when the newsagent was asked to stock a copy of the Sporting Life.<ref>{{cite news |title= The Queen's low-key visits to Uckfield (video story) |url= https://www.bbc.co.uk/news/uk-england-sussex-17586695 |work= BBC News Online |date= 2 April 2012 |access-date= 3 April 2012 |quote= call at 11 pm Saturday The Queen is coming to church tomorrow" ... "bit late to prepare a special sermon!" |archive-date= 6 April 2012 |archive-url= https://web.archive.org/web/20120406105127/http://www.bbc.co.uk/news/uk-england-sussex-17586695 |url-status= live }}</ref> The Roman Catholic church is dedicated to Our Lady Immaculate and St Philip Neri. Uckfield Baptist Church was founded in 1785 by seceders from nearby Five Ash Down Independent Chapel, and a new building opened at the top of the High Street in 1789 (rebuilt 1874); it closed in 2005, but the congregation now meet at a school. Other churches and chapels include Methodist, Evangelical (Grange Evangelical Church in Hempstead Road), United Reformed Church and the King's Church.

Notable people
Emma Lee French was born in Uckfield in 1836. Frank Tuohy, prize-winning author and academic, was born in Uckfield in 1925. Uckfield was the last place Lord Lucan was seen, at Grants Hill House, the home of his friends Ian and Susan Maxwell-Scott. Lady Lucan, his wife, was born in Uckfield. The actress Marjorie Westbury lived at Maresfield near Uckfield.  Nicholas van Hoogstraten, a property developer, owns property in the area. He was engaged in a long-running dispute with the Ramblers' Association about a local footpath running through his land. Work came to a halt on Hamilton Palace in 2001. The singer Rag'n'Bone Man is from this town, winner of the Brits Critic's choice award 2017, he had a number one single across Europe with the song Human. The actor Roman Griffin Davis is from this town, he starred in the acclaimed film Jojo Rabbit for which he was nominated for a Golden Globe Award.

Folklore
There are a number of mysteries and myths associated with the town and surrounding areas. The most well known is the disappearance of Lord Lucan, who was reportedly last seen at Grants Hill House in Uckfield. In addition, the hoax of the Piltdown Man occurred in the nearby village of Piltdown.  There is a tale of Nan Tuck's Ghost, in which an old witch is said to have lived in a wood in nearby Buxted. There is an area of the wood where nothing grows, and the ghost is said to chase people who wander along Nan Tuck's Lane at night.

Culture

The Picture House Cinema

The Picture House, an independently run three-screen cinema, was established in 1916 and is one of the oldest in England.

Ashdown Radio (formerly Uckfield FM)

Uckfield FM is a community radio station that supported Uckfield for its four-week festival in June and at Christmas each year. In July 2009 the station was granted a licence by Ofcom to become a full-time community radio station, broadcasting live to Uckfield and the surrounding areas from 1 July 2010. The station was founded by Mike Skinner, Paddy Rea, Gary King and Alan French and now has over 80 members who are all voluntary. In the summer of 2008, ITV's Trinny and Suzannah was filmed at the Bird in Eye studios when Mayor Louise Eastwood was the star of the show. In 2014 the station was granted a five-year extension to its licence, taking "Uckfield FM's service through until 2020".  As of 1 April 2022, the station expanded it's FM coverage area to take in the neighbouring town of Crowborough, and has re-launched as Ashdown Radio.

Uckfield Festival

The festival was originally intended "as a one off Millennium year celebration", from this event it has sought to "advance the public in the arts and in particular, the arts of music, speech, drama and the visual arts". A number of local organisations/events have grown from the festival some of these include The Art Trail, The Film Society & Uckfield FM.

Uckfield Carnival
Uckfield hold an annual torchlight carnival on the first Saturday in September. The High Street is closed in the evening and local bonfire societies, sports teams, schools and businesses join a procession through the town.

Twin towns
  Quickborn, Germany
  Arques-la-Bataille, France

Sport and leisure
A.F.C. Uckfield Town are the town's main football club, formed by a merger of A.F.C. Uckfield and Uckfield Town in 2014.

Uckfield Grasshoppers JFC is the town's main junior football club, established in 1981. They have teams from U6s to U18s.

Uckfield RFC is the town's Rugby Football Club, with a men's squad, women's squad and various junior levels from U5s to U16s.

References in literature

 The manic playwright character Roland Maule, in the play Present Laughter (1942) by Noël Coward, is from Uckfield.
 Uckfield was mentioned in the last chapter of John le Carré's The Honourable Schoolboy (1977).
 Uckfield was the setting for the book Maximum Diner (2004) by Christopher Nye. It is an autobiographical work which tells of Nye's successful attempt to establish an American-style restaurant in a small town. The Maximum Diner, under new management,  in operation.
 Uckfield was featured in Julian Fellowes's novel Snobs (2004), which includes fictional characters the Marquess and Marchioness of Uckfield.
 The cover of the Ladybird Books children's book Climate Change'' (2017), co-authored by Charles, Prince of Wales, depicts heavy flooding in Uckfield.
 The opening scene of the movie Crazy Rich Asians (2018) makes a passing reference to "The Dowager Marchioness of Uckfield."

References

External links
 
 
 

 
Towns in East Sussex
Civil parishes in East Sussex
Wealden District
Local Nature Reserves in East Sussex